Chenar-e Razbashi (also Romanized as Chenār-e Rāzbāshī; also known as Chenār, Rāzbāshī, Rāzbāshī Chenār, and Rāzbāshī-ye ‘Olyā) is a village in Beyranvand-e Shomali Rural District, Bayravand District, Khorramabad County, Lorestan Province, Iran. At the 2006 census, its population was 62, in 14 families.

References 

Towns and villages in Khorramabad County